Georges Willems (born 5 September 1888, date of death unknown) was a Belgian rower. He competed at the 1912 Summer Olympics in Stockholm with the men's coxed four where they were eliminated in the quarter finals.

References

1888 births
Year of death missing
Belgian male rowers
Olympic rowers of Belgium
Rowers at the 1912 Summer Olympics
European Rowing Championships medalists
20th-century Belgian people